Fat Princess Adventures is an action role-playing  video game developed by Fun Bits Interactive and published by Sony Computer Entertainment for PlayStation 4. This game is the second major installment in PlayStation Studios' Fat Princess franchise. It was released in North America and Europe on December 5, 2015.

Gameplay
Unlike its predecessor, Fat Princess Adventures is a 4-player, co-op hack-and-slash dungeon crawler. Players can switch between four character classes at anytime, Warrior, Mage, Archer, and Engineer, each with their own unique abilities and progression paths. At certain points within the game, the princesses serve as non-playable guides to the players, assisting with magic attacks, healing spells, and turning enemies into cake.

Reception

Fat Princess Adventures has received mixed to positive reviews from critics, scoring 66/100 on Metacritic, and 66.67% on GameRankings.

Mark Steighner of Hardcore Gamer gave the game a 4 out of 5: "Fat Princess was subversive, politically incorrect and unexpectedly complex in its strategy and depth. Fat Princess Adventures trades a little of that depth for a more straightforward, action RPG-focused design". Chris Carter from Destructoid rated the game a 7/10: "Fat Princess Adventures is an enjoyable distraction for hardcore fans of the hack-and-slash genre, but now I just want a proper new Princess game".

References

External links
Fat Princess Adventures at PlayStation.com

2015 video games
Action role-playing video games
PlayStation 4 games
PlayStation 4-only games
PlayStation Network games
Sony Interactive Entertainment games
Video games about food and drink
Video games developed in the United States
Works about obesity
Works about princesses
Video game sequels
Video games featuring female protagonists
Multiplayer and single-player video games